The 1980 British League season was the 46th season of the top tier of speedway in the United Kingdom and the 16th season known as the British League.

Summary
The league comprised 17 teams - one fewer than the previous season. Exeter Falcons had dropped down to the National League.  Hackney Hawks underwent a dramatic transformation from being the bottom side in 1979 to title contenders in 1980, but their challenge faded in the last few weeks and Reading Racers were crowned champions for the second time.

Reading's success came down to three strong heat leaders, Swedish champion Jan Andersson, their new American signing Bobby Schwartz and England international John Davis. All three produced season averages around the 10 mark, which enabled the team to constantly pick up victories. Cradley Heathens successfully retained their Knockout Cup crown overcoming a huge first leg deficit in the final.

Final table
M = Matches; W = Wins; D = Draws; L = Losses; Pts = Total Points

British League Knockout Cup
The 1980 Speedway Star British League Knockout Cup was the 42nd edition of the Knockout Cup for tier one teams. Cradley Heath were the winners.

First round

Second round

Quarter-finals

Semi-finals

Final

First leg

Second leg

Cradley Heath were declared Knockout Cup Champions, winning on aggregate 116-100.

Final leading averages

Riders & final averages
Belle Vue

 10.67
 10.09
 7.69
 6.33
 6.24
 5.35
 5.17
 4.91
 4.25
 4.22

Birmingham

 8.57 
 8.24
 7.39
 6.22
 6.09
 5.97
 5.93
 5.56
 3.70
 2.70

Coventry

 9.52
 8.54
 8.10
 6.83
 6.27
 5.83
 5.61
 4.00

Cradley Heath

 10.39
 8.32 
 8.17
 8.13 
 8.09 
 5.32
 5.16
 4.84
 4.23
 4.05
 1.78
 0.73

Eastbourne

 9.71
 8.35
 6.28
 6.12
 5.57
 4.87
 4.64
 4.24
 3.87
 3.61
 1.81

Hackney

 10.27
 8.12
 7.76
 5.49
 5.29
 5.19
 4.94 
 4.24

Halifax

 8.92
 7.92
 6.54
 6.06 
 5.80
 5.39
 3.50
 2.86

Hull

 9.32 
 9.00
 7.57
 6.68
 6.47
 5.17
 4.84
 4.67
 4.65
 4.17

Ipswich

 9.09
 8.80
 8.34
 7.20
 6.37
 5.82
 5.77
 5.33
 4.80
 4.72

King's Lynn

 10.39
 10.14
 8.95
 6.52
 5.22
 4.26
 3.82

Leicester

 8.93
 7.69
 7.42
 6.38
 6.20
 5.91
 5.60
 5.23

Poole

 9.40 
 9.11 
 7.26
 6.96
 6.76
 4.95
 4.77
 4.00
 1.11

Reading

 10.04 
 10.00
 9.59
 7.37
 5.87
 5.30
 4.98
 1.80

Sheffield

 8.00
 7.11
 6.37
 6.20
 5.09
 5.04
 4.86
 4.37
 3.67
 3.23

Swindon

 9.92
 9.59
 7.41
 7.24
 6.53
 5.54
 5.42
 5.31
 5.00
 2.72
 2.00

Wimbledon

 9.12
 8.22
 8.08
 6.36
 5.82
 5.08
 3.06
 2.46
 2.24

Wolverhampton

 10.69
 7.08
 7.01
 5.85
 5.73
 5.36
 5.33
 5.07
 3.93
 3.68
 2.62

See also
List of United Kingdom Speedway League Champions
Knockout Cup (speedway)

References

British League
1980 in British motorsport
1980 in speedway